Cuthonella modesta is a species of sea slug, an aeolid nudibranch, a marine gastropod mollusc in the family Cuthonellidae.

Distribution
This species was described from Hut Point, Ross Sea, Antarctica. It has been reported from McMurdo Sound.

References

Cuthonellidae
Gastropods described in 1907